
Gmina Żelazków is a rural gmina (administrative district) in Kalisz County, Greater Poland Voivodeship, in west-central Poland.

Villages
Gmina Żelazków contains the villages and settlements of Anielin, Biernatki, Chrusty, Czartki, Dębe, Florentyna, Garzew, Goliszew, Góry Zborowskie, Góry Złotnickie, Helenów, Ilno, Janków, Kokanin, Kolonia Kokanin, Kolonia Skarszewek, Koronka, Michałów, Niedźwiady, Nowy Borków, Pólko, Russów, Russówek, Skarszew, Skarszewek, Stary Borków, Strugi, Szosa Turecka, Tykadłów, Witoldów, Wojciechówka, Zborów, Żelazków, Złotniki Małe and Złotniki Wielkie.

Neighbouring gminas
Gmina Żelazków is bordered by the city of Kalisz and by the gminas of Blizanów, Ceków-Kolonia, Mycielin, Opatówek and Stawiszyn.

References
Polish official population figures 2006

Zelazkow
Kalisz County